Bryan Mills (born August 3, 1999) is an American football cornerback for the Birmingham Stallions of the United States Football League (USFL). He played college football at North Carolina Central.

College career
Mills began his college career at Antelope Valley College. He started at cornerback as a freshman and was named All-Southern California Football Association. After receiving no Division I offers, Mills transferred to the College of the Canyons before his sophomore year. After the end of the season, he committed to transfer to North Carolina Central for his remaining collegiate eligibility.

Professional career

Seattle Seahawks
Mills signed with the Seattle Seahawks as an undrafted free agent on May 1, 2021. He was waived during training camp on August 12, 2021.

New Orleans Saints
Mills was signed by the New Orleans Saints on August 18, 2021, after participating in a tryout for the team. He was waived on August 31, 2021, during final roster cuts.

Cleveland Browns
Mills was signed by the Cleveland Browns to their practice squad on September 30, 2021. He was released by the Browns on December 28, 2021.

Minnesota Vikings
Mills was signed to the Minnesota Vikings on January 5, 2022. Mills was elevated to the active roster on January 9, 2022, for the team's Week 18 game against the Chicago Bears and made his NFL debut in the 31-17 victory.

Birmingham Stallions
Mills was selected with the seventh pick of the 10th round of the 2022 USFL Draft by the Birmingham Stallions. He was transferred to the inactive roster on May 14, but moved back to the active roster the next day.

References

External links
North Carolina Central Eagles bio
Minnesota Vikings bio

1999 births
Living people
Players of American football from California
African-American players of American football
American football cornerbacks
College of the Canyons Cougars football players
North Carolina Central Eagles football players
People from Palmdale, California
Minnesota Vikings players
Seattle Seahawks players
Sportspeople from Los Angeles County, California
New Orleans Saints players
Cleveland Browns players
21st-century African-American people
Birmingham Stallions (2022) players